WPK could refer to:
   
 Workers' Party of Korea, ruling party of North Korea
 Winter Park (Amtrak station), Florida, United States; Amtrak Station Code WPK
 Wertpapierkennnummer, a German securities identification code
 Workers' Party of Kampuchea, later Khmer Rouge